Chappo may refer to:

 Chappo, son of Apache leader Geronimo
 James Chapman (rower), Australian rower
 John Chapman (evangelist), Australian preacher
 Mark Chapman (cricketer), Hong Kong cricketer
 Mitchell Chapman, Australian rugby player
 Roger Chapman, English rock vocalist
 Chappo (album), first album by Roger Chapman
 Chappo (band), an indie rock band signed with Majordomo Records
 Chappo, California 92055, place in San Diego County